"Printer's Measure" is an episode of the TV anthology series The Philco Television Playhouse written by Paddy Chayefsky.

It was a reworking of a story Chayefsky had written in college.

The play was highly acclaimed and ended up being published in a volume of Chayefsky's work.

References

External links
 

1953 American television episodes
Works by Paddy Chayefsky
The Philco Television Playhouse episodes
Television episodes directed by Delbert Mann